Lucienne M'belu (born August 3, 1989 in Créteil) is a French athlete, who specializes in 100 meter and 200 meter competitions. Her club is EACPA (l'Entente Agglomération Cergy Pontoise Athlétisme).

References

1989 births
Living people
Universiade medalists in athletics (track and field)
Universiade bronze medalists for France
French female sprinters
Medalists at the 2009 Summer Universiade